Yelena Veniaminovna Bondarenko (born 10 June 1968) is a Russian politician for the United Russia party. She was born in Svetlograd, and represents Georgiyevsk in the State Duma.

Due to Bondarenko's public support for the Russian invasion of Ukraine, she was sanctioned by the European Union, United Kingdom, United States, Canada, Switzerland, Australia, Japan, Ukraine, and New Zealand.

References 

1968 births
Living people
Eighth convocation members of the State Duma (Russian Federation)
21st-century Russian women politicians
United Russia politicians
People from Stavropol Krai
Seventh convocation members of the State Duma (Russian Federation)